Dubat (Arabic: العمائم البيضاء(دُوب عد); ḍubbāṭ: English: White turban) was the designation given to members of the semi-regular armed bands employed by the Italian "Royal Corps of Colonial Troops" (Regio Corpo di Truppe Coloniali in Italian) in Italian Somaliland from 1924 to 1941. The word dubat was derived from a Somali phrase meaning "white turban".

Origin and duties

Dubats were local soldiers from Italian Somaliland that were employed in Italian military service after World War I.

First raised in July 1924 by Colonel Camillo Bechis, they mainly served as frontier guards and light infantry, developing a reputation as effective fighters. Dubats were maintained as permanent units and were better trained and armed than the tribal banda irregulars raised as temporary auxiliaries when needed by the Italian authorities in Somalia and other colonies.

Dubats were concentrated along the British Somaliland, Ethiopian and East Africa Protectorate frontiers.

Camel mounted detachments (recul) were also employed for patrol work in the Ogaden region.

Attire, weaponry and ranks

From their establishment, Dubats wore the white futa, a traditional Somali sarong-like garment. They also wore smaller lengths of futa cloth as turbans (dub), tightly wrapped around their heads. The term dubat (literally "white turban") was derived from this headdress.

During 1935–36, a khaki version of the futa and turban, including a saharianna tunic, was adopted for service wear. 

The Somali non-commissioned officers ranks were distinguished by neck lanyards with end tassels as follows:
 "capo comandante" (commander) - green, 
 "capo" (sergeant) - red,
 "sotto-capo" (corporal) - black.

Commissioned officers of the Dubats were all Italians. They were usually seconded from the six regular Arab-Somali battalions of the Royal Corps of Colonial Troops, recruited in the territories of present-day Somalia and Yemen.

Dubats were armed with either Carcano M1891 or Mannlicher M1895 rifles. They also carried curved traditional Somali daggers called billao.

Campaigns

During 1925–27, three thousand Dubats saw service in the Campaign of the Sultanates, involving the occupation of the autonomous regions of Obbia, where the Sultan Yusuf Ali Kenadid ruled over the Sultanate of Hobyo, and Migiurtinia (1923–27), where Boqor Osman Mahamud ruled the Sultanate. During their raids the Dubats reached Ras Hafun. 

During late 1927, Dubats were used to raid across the border into Ethiopia, where clan militiamen from Migiurtinia had regrouped in Gorrahei. The use of Dubat irregulars for these intrusions enabled the Italians to avoid diplomatic complications with Ethiopia.

The four original bands were increased to ten during the early stages of the Italian invasion of Ethiopia in 1935. On 5 December 1934, a clash occurred between a detachment of Dubats occupying the Walwal oasis in the Ogaden, and Ethiopian troops escorting a border commission. This incident provided the pretext for the subsequent Second Italian-Abyssinian War. Nearly 20,000 Dubats and other irregulars served with the Italian forces during the 1936 conquest of Ethiopia.

With the occupation of Ethiopia, the Dubats were re-deployed in the Ogaden Desert and along the frontiers of French and British Somaliland. They saw ongoing action against Ethiopian guerrillas in Hararghe.

On the eve of Italy's entry into World War II, the Dubats underwent reorganisation, becoming more closely integrated with the regular Somali units of the Royal Corps of Colonial Troops. The 1st Dubat Group subsequently served as part of General De Simone's Column during the successful Italian invasion of British Somaliland in August 1940. Dubats participated in the attack on the British colony of Kenya and the conquest of Moyale and Buna.

During the East African Campaign of 1941, the Dubats served with the Pietro Gazzera army group. Following the British military occupation of Italian Somaliland in 1941, the Dubats were disbanded.

British Dubas
Between 1936 and the late 1950s the British colonial government maintained a force of tribal police known as "Dubas" in the Northern Frontier District of Kenya, bordering Somaliland. Some were camel mounted. The Dubas performed similar functions as their Italian colonial counterparts, on whom they were modeled. They wore the same white indigenous dress, though with red turbans.

Honors

One Gold Medal of Military Valor:

 
With the courage of their race - fueled by love for the flag and the belief in the higher destinies of Italy in Africa, gave during the war, many proofs of the most brilliant heroism. With great generosity, and similar faithfulness, gave their blood for the consecration of the Italian Empire. Italo-Ethiopian War, October 3, 1935 - May 5, 1936. - November 19, 1936.

See also

 Italian Empire
 Amedeo Guillet
 Bands (Italian Army irregulars)
 Eritrean Ascari
 Zaptié

Bibliography
"The Italian Invasion of Abyssinia 1935-36"; David Nicolle 1997; 
"Le Uniformi dell AOI (Somalia 1889-1941)" Piero Crociani, la Roccia 1980

References

Dubats
Dubats
Dubats
Italian Somaliland
Italian colonial troops